is a Japanese classical pianist.

She won 2nd prize in the 2000 Sydney International Piano Competition.  In 2002 she became the first woman (and first Japanese citizen) to win the Tchaikovsky International Piano Competition.

References 

Women classical pianists
Japanese classical pianists
Japanese women pianists
Prize-winners of the International Tchaikovsky Competition
Sydney International Piano Competition prize-winners
1980 births
EMI Classics and Virgin Classics artists
Living people
Musicians from Kagawa Prefecture
21st-century Japanese women musicians
People from Takamatsu, Kagawa
21st-century women pianists